Camptogenys is a genus of beetles in the family Carabidae, containing the following species:

 Camptogenys aberrans (Tschitscherine, 1899)
 Camptogenys similis Tschitscherine, 1898
 Camptogenys trisetosa (A.serrano, 1995)

References

Pterostichinae